Karki or Tigranashen is a village that is de jure an enclave of Azerbaijan, de facto under the control of Armenia, administrated within the Ararat Municipality of the Ararat Province. The main highway connecting northern Armenia with southern Armenia passes right by the village. The village is today mostly inhabited by Armenians, both locals and refugees from Azerbaijan.

Geography 

History 
The village was captured by Armenian forces on 19 January 1990, during the First Nagorno-Karabakh War.

Since May 1992, following the First Nagorno-Karabakh War, Karki has been controlled by Armenia, which administers the  territory as part of its Ararat Province.

After the war, many of the former inhabitants of Karki resettled in a new village, Yeni Kərki (New Karki), created within the Kangarli District of Azerbaijan.

Demographics 
According to the 1910 publication of Kavkazskiy kalendar, Karki had a predominantly Tatar population of 244 in 1908. This number increased slightly to 245 in 1911.

The village had a present population of 151, and a permanent population of 154 in 2011.

Gallery

See also 
Artsvashen
Barkhudarli
Yukhari Askipara
Ashagi Askipara
Yeni Kərki

Notes

References

Bibliography

Populated places in Azerbaijan
Populated places in Sadarak District
Enclaves and exclaves